Pontefract and Castleford was a constituency represented in the House of Commons of the Parliament of the United Kingdom until the 2010 general election. It elected one Member of Parliament (MP) by the first past the post system of election.

Boundaries
1974–1983: The Municipal Boroughs of Castleford and Pontefract, and the Urban District of Featherstone.

1983–2010: The City of Wakefield wards of Castleford Ferry Fryston, Castleford Glasshoughton, Castleford Whitwood, Knottingley, Pontefract North, and Pontefract South.

The constituency covered the West Yorkshire towns of Pontefract and Castleford. It was a very safe Labour seat, made up of former mining towns and villages. The MP from 1997 until its abolition in 2010, Shadow Home Secretary Yvette Cooper, is married to former fellow Labour MP, former Shadow Chancellor Ed Balls.

Boundary review
Following their review of parliamentary representation in West Yorkshire, the number of seats in West Yorkshire were reduced by one due to population decline by the Boundary Commission for England. A new, geographically larger, constituency called Normanton, Pontefract and Castleford was created in 2010 including the whole of this constituency.

Members of Parliament

Elections

Elections in the 2000s

Elections in the 1990s

Elections in the 1980s

Elections in the 1970s

See also
List of parliamentary constituencies in West Yorkshire

Notes and references

Constituencies of the Parliament of the United Kingdom established in 1974
Constituencies of the Parliament of the United Kingdom disestablished in 2010
Politics of Wakefield
Parliamentary constituencies in Yorkshire and the Humber (historic)